William Arthur Watkin Strachan (16 April 1921 – 26 April 1998) was a leading British communist, black civil rights pioneer, charity worker, and British legal expert, most famous for both his wartime achievements with the Royal Air Force (RAF) during World War II, and his reputation as a highly influential figure within Britain's black communities. During WWII, Strachan survived 33 bombing operations against Nazi Germany. After the war he became a communist and a human rights activist, campaigning for universal suffrage and worker's rights. Between 1952 and 1956 he published the newspaper Caribbean News, the first monthly Black British newspaper.

Strachan acted as a mentor to many leading British black civil rights activists, including Trevor Carter and Dorothy Kuya. Strachan was also a leading member of the Communist Party of Great Britain (CPGB). Billy Strachan is widely recognised by numerous historians, activists, and academics as one of the most influential and widely respected black civil rights figures in British-Caribbean history, and a pioneer of black civil rights in Britain.

Early life 
Strachan was born in Jamaica on 16 April 1921 to a family of former slaves and was raised within a predominantly white and relatively privileged area of Kingston. In 1938, Strachan witnessed the creation of the People's National Party.

Career

Joining the Royal Air Force 
In 1939 following Britain's declaration of war against Germany and the outbreak of World War II in Europe, Strachan left his job in the civil service to join the British Royal Air Force (RAF). He was told by the British that he would have to pay for his own journey to Britain, so Strachan sold his bicycle and saxophone to pay for his voyage. Strachan was one of the first volunteers to arrive in England in March 1940. He arrived in Britain with little money and a suitcase containing only one spare change of clothes. After spending a night at the YMCA he travelled to the Air Ministry in Kingsway and attempted to join the RAF.

After selling his possessions and travelling 5,000 miles by ship and at risk from U-boat attack to join the RAF, Airmen on guard duty at the Air Ministry racially attacked Billy Strachan, telling him that "his sort" should "go back to where they came from". Eventually, a young officer came to Strachan's aid, telling Strachan that he was educated and that he knew that Jamaica was in west Africa. Strachan decided that it would be best not to correct the young officer on Jamaica's actual location, and was taken inside the building where he underwent health, education and intelligence tests. Strachan passed all these tests and was soon wearing an RAF uniform.

Second World War achievements 
Aged 18, he was sent to an RAF base in Blackpool for military training. Strachan was trained as aircrew and first flew in 1941. He first became a radio operator, then he became a gunner, flying a tour of operations in RAF Bomber Command as an air gunner on Vickers Wellingtons with 156 Squadron. After completing his first tour of 30 operations, he remustered and retrained as a pilot, flying solo after only 7 hours of training. He flew 15 operations as a pilot with 576 Squadron flying Avro Lancasters from RAF Fiskerton in Lincolnshire. He felt unwell on his last operation on 14 April 1945, jettisoning his bombs over the North Sea and returning to base. He later explained that he had almost flown in to Lincoln Cathedral. He was prone to "joyriding" and attempting dangerous tricks which his instructors did not approve of. He survived a serious airplane crash which left him with life-long hip injuries, which were not operated on until 1952 when Strachan befriended a communist doctor in Prague. Strachan rose to the rank of Flight Lieutenant within the RAF, a rare achievement for a black person in Britain in the 1940s. Strachan completed 45 bombing operations against Nazi Germany, another rare achievement considering that the average life of an RAF bomber crew during WWII was 6/7 operations.

Recounting his experiences, Strachan shared his advice on how he managed to survive being targeted by German aircraft: "The trick," he explained, "was to wait until the enemy was right on your tail and, at the last minute, cut the engines, sending the aircraft into a plunging dive, letting the fighter overshoot harmlessly above." Strachan's rise within the ranks of the RAF earned him a personal servant known as a "batman". His batman had previously been the servant of the British King George VI. Strachan soon became a minor celebrity within the RAF due to his lucky survival of so many bomber operations. One time while stationed in Yorkshire near Hull, Strachan visited a dentist in an underground surgery, and returned to the surface to find that all the buildings above ground had been destroyed by bombs. By the end of the war, Strachan was an RAF liaison officer working to investigate racial incidents on RAF bases.

Brief return to Jamaica 
Sometime during the war, Strachan married a woman called Joyce Smith. By the end of WWII, Billy Strachan was a married man and a father of 3 children. The Strachan family briefly moved to Jamaica in 1946, and he resumed the civil service job he held before WWII. Racism would continue to plague Stratchan's civilian career, as he was denied promotions in the civil service based on his race. While in Jamaica he met British communist Dr David Lewis, who introduced Strachan to Marxism, leading to Strachan becoming a life-long communist. Dr David Lewis admired Strachan's leadership skills and invited back to Britain to help create the London branch of the Caribbean Labour Congress, an organisation dedicated to promoting workers rights and universal suffrage in the Caribbean.

Later in life Strachan told one of his sons that "Because of the way my life was to go if I hadn’t discovered Marxism I would have undoubtedly ended up in a mental institution."

Communist and black activism in Britain 
Returning to Britain in 1947, Billy Strachan joined the Communist Party of Great Britain (CPGB) and quickly became an active member, holding weekly street meetings and selling the Daily Worker. Strachan would from then on support the communist movement for the rest of his life, and was also an avid supporter of both the Soviet Union and the Chinese Communist Party. As more West Indians arrived in Britain,  the more radical elements of the black community also joined the CPGB, with many of them seeing Strachan as their leader. His communist activism as a CPGB member put him into contact with many influential British communists and socialists including Kay Beauchamp, Palme Dutt, and Cheddi Jagan. Strachan also lived temporarily with another Afro-Caribbean communist leader living in Britain called Trevor Carter, the cousin of famous Black-British civil rights activist Claudia Jones who founded Britain's first major black newspaper. Culturally he also came into contact with the works of communist musicians including Alan Bush, A. L. Lloyd, Ewan MacColl, and the dramas of Bertolt Brecht. Strachan also became an important member of the CPGB's International Committee, and their West Indian Committee.

In 1948 Billy Strachan helped to found the London branch of the Caribbean Labour Congress, an organisation dedicated to promoting workers rights and universal suffrage in the Caribbean. Strachan served as the secretary of the London branch from its founding in 1948 to 1956. Come the start of the Cold War, reactionary Caribbean leaders began persecuting their communist allies and ordered the London branch to dissolve. Strachan and the other members of the London branch refused this order to disband, and instead in 1952 began to publish a socialist and Anti-imperialist newspaper called Caribbean News which was published between 1952 and 1956. Fellow Caribbean communist Ranji Chandisingh helped Strachan run Caribbean News and served as the paper's editor. Billy Strachan's biographer, David Horsley, described Caribbean News as "the first Black British monthly newspaper dedicated to the ideals of Caribbean independence, socialism, and solidarity with colonial and oppressed people throughout the world."

Caribbean tour and political persecution 
After an attempt by the British government to ban Billy Strachan from international travel for his communist and anti-colonial beliefs, both Strachan and his travel companion the Caribbean communist Ferdinand Smith were kidnapped by the United States government. In a case of McCarthyist persecution of communists, the airplane that both Strachan and Smith were travelling on was diverted to take them both to New York jail. Strachan recalls that ironically he could see the Statue of Liberty through the bars of his cell window. The illegal arrest of both Strachan and Smith led to a campaign to free them which was headed by UK Labour Party MP Maurice Orbach.

Billy Strachan would briefly return to Jamaica, sneaking into the country illegally despite being barred from many Caribbean countries due to his communist beliefs. Under the auspices of the World Federation of Trade Unions, Billy Strachan teamed up with fellow Afro-Caribbean communist Ferdinand Smith to complete a speaking tour of the British West Indies. Despite being banned from many of the countries they toured, their events were met with huge crowds and became very successful. To honour their success, a Caribbean Calypso song was written by Richard Hart, titled "The Ferdie and Billy Calypso".

Successful legal career 
After returning to Britain from his tour of the British West Indies, Strachan began to self-study law while also raising his young family. He intensely studied law using books he borrowed from the library, and in 1959 he was called to the bar. He earned his Bachelor of Law degree in 1967 and eventually rose to become the first clerk of courts and then chief clerk of court at Clerkenwell. Due to the political persecution of communists in Britain he could no longer continue to be an open communist, so it was decided by the CPGB leadership that he should no longer hold a party card but could still support the party in other ways.  In 1971 Strachan was elected president of the Inner London Justices Clerks Society. Strachan led a highly successful legal career, and became the author of many defining legal guides on a variety of subjects including adoption and drink driving.

Riding for the Disabled Association 
Despite suffering terrible pain from an injury he sustained after being shot in the hip by a German during WWII, Strachan greatly enjoyed horse riding. Strachan became a key figure in the creation of the Riding for the Disabled Association, a British charity that provides horse riding lessons to disabled people. Strachan strategically allowed the British princess Anne, the daughter of British Queen Elizabeth, to serve as the charity's president, while he himself served as the charity's vice-president.  During the 1970s Billy Strachan and his wife Joyce got divorced. During the 1980s while horse riding, Strachan met a woman called Mary Collins, whom he married in 1983, becoming his second and final wife.

Later life 
Strachan would continue to support the British communist movement until his death. Strachan was also one of the founders of the Movement for Colonial Freedom.

Strachan was a close friend of both Cheddi Jagan, the first chief minister of Guyana and the first person of Indian descent to become leader of a country outside of Asia, and Guyana's president Janet Jagan. During one trip to Guyana in 1996, Billy Strachan began to feel ill and it was soon discovered that he was suffering from a motor neuron disease. He was cared for by his wife during his final years alive.

Death and legacy 
Billy Strachan died on the 26 April 1998, after a battle with a motor neuron disease.

Strachan is widely recognised by numerous historians, activists, and academics as one of the most influential and widely respected black civil rights figures in British-Caribbean history, and a pioneer of black civil rights. Journalist John Gulliver described Strachan's life as a "life of sheer heroism". Billy Strachan's biographer, David Horsley, describes Strachan as a "civil rights pioneer", and a "remarkable and often overlooked figure in British Caribbean history".  Strachan was held in high regard by many leading British black civil rights activists, including Trevor Carter, Claudia Jones, Cleston Taylor, and Winston Pinder, the latter of which described Strachan as "our father". Strachan was also widely praised by many Caribbean leaders Richard Hart, John La Rose, and Cheddi Jagan.

In January 2020 the Marx Memorial Library in London held an event to piece together the life of Billy Strachan, with the event attended by historical researchers and members of the Strachan family.

Television 
British television presenter Lenny Henry wrote a script for a biographical film of Billy Strachan's life titled A Wing and a Prayer, however the script was never turned into a movie. Peter Frost, a researcher of British leftist history, believes that Strachan's communist beliefs were somewhat responsible for the movie not being created.

In 2018, historical footage of Billy Strachan was used to illustrate the Windrush generation in episode 4 of Diane Morgan's comedic mockumentary series, Cunk on Britain.

Comments on his life 
Britain's Black History Month Magazine described Billy Strachan as:"a World War 2 R.A.F. hero, a Civil Rights pioneer and leader, a life long Communist, a prominent law officer, and a gifted writer."After Strachan's death, the former president of Guyana, Janet Jagan, praised Billy Strachan's life and legacy:"Billy was my friend, my comrade, my mentor for most of my adult life. He was a genuine Caribbean man always in the forefront of labour and political challenges of our region I will miss him very much. Life without Billy is not the same”.The Communist Party of Britain, the continuation of the original Communist Party of Great Britain (CPGB) which Billy Strachan had been a member of, also praised Strachan's life and legacy:"Billy Strachan was a true Communist dedicating his adult life to a better world for all, one without exploitation, poverty and racism."

Historical archives 
Before his death, staff from London's Imperial War Museum interviewed Billy Strachan on his life and recorded and published the audio. It can be listed to by the public on the Imperial War Museum's website, as a part of the Imperial War Museum Sound Archive.

Further archival material relevant to Billy Strachan's life, including 40 boxes from Strachan's personal collections, is held at the University of London.

Works written by Strachan 

 Natural Justice: Principle and Practice (1976)
 Matrimonial proceedings in magistrates courts: The Domestic Proceedings and Magistrates''' (1982)
 The Drinking Driver and the Law (1983)
 Matrimonial Proceedings in Magistrates' Courts (1987)Fruitful Isolation: Imaginative Study of Paul's Letter to the Philippians (1991)
 Adoption'' (1992)

See also 

 Paul Robeson
 Charlie Hutchison
 Dorothy Kuya
David Ivon Jones
Communist Party of Britain

References 

Communist Party of Great Britain members
1921 births
1998 deaths
Civil rights and liberties in the United Kingdom
Jamaican communists
People from Kingston, Jamaica
20th-century British businesspeople
Royal Air Force officers
British civil rights activists
Royal Air Force pilots of World War II